Thyrsitops lepidopoides, the white snake mackerel, is a species of snake mackerel found off the coasts of South America from Brazil on the Atlantic side to Chile on the Pacific side. This species can reach a length of  SL though most do not exceed  SL. It is of minor importance to local commercial fisheries. It is currently the only known member of its genus.

References

External links
 Photograph

Mackerels
Gempylidae
Fish described in 1832
Taxa named by Georges Cuvier
Monotypic fish genera